Reign of Terror is the second by Australian metalcore band Capture The Crown. This is the final album the band released with the name Capture the Crown before they changed their name to just Capture. The album was produced by both Matt Good and Taylor Larson from the band From First to Last, and was released through the record label Artery Recordings.  The first single off the album, "To Whom It May Concern", was released on 9 June 2014. It is the last album to feature guitarists Kris Sheehan, Jye Menzies, and drummer, Tyler March, after their departures on 4 October 2014, as well as the first album to feature bassist Maurice Morfaw. Reign of Terror was re-released as a deluxe edition with the five tracks from the "Live Life" EP on 24 November. Reign of Terror charted at No. 86 on the U.S. Billboard 200, the band's first album to chart in the U.S., as well as the third Australian metal band to chart.

Track listing

Personnel
Credits by Allmusic
Capture the Crown
Jeffrey Wellfare - lead vocals
Jye Menzies - lead guitar
Kris Sheehan - rhythm guitar
Tyler "Lone America" March - drums
Maurice Morfaw - bass

Additional Personnel
Cheyne Truitt - guest vocals on "Beating the Blade"
Alex Koehler (ex-Chelsea Grin) - guest vocals on "Make War, Not Love"

Production
Taylor Larson - Producer, engineer, mastering, mixing, writing
Matt Good - Additional Production, programming, writing
Shawn Christmas - Programming
Mike Milford - A&R, Artwork, Design, Layout
Sam Shepard - Artwork, Design, Layout
Ernie Slenkovich - Engineer, percussion, writing

References

2014 albums
Albums produced by Cameron Mizell
Capture (band) albums
Albums produced by Matt Good